Two ships in the United States Navy have been named USS Grapple.

 , commissioned in 1943, struck in 1977 and sold to Taiwan.
 , commissioned in 1985. .

United States Navy ship names